Baron Amschel Mayer von Rothschild (12 June 1773 – 6 December 1855) was a German Jewish banker of the wealthy Rothschild family.

He was the second child and eldest son of Mayer Amschel Rothschild (1744–1812), the founder of the dynasty, and Gutlé Rothschild née Schnapper (1753–1849).

On the death of Mayer Amschel in 1812, Amschel Mayer succeeded as head of the bank at Frankfurt am Main, his brothers having been dispatched to set up banking houses in Paris, London, Naples, and Vienna.

As Amschel Mayer died childless, the sons of his brothers (Anselm, son of Salomon, and Mayer Carl and Wilhelm Carl, sons of Carl) assumed responsibility for the business from 1855.

He was ennobled as Amschel Mayer von Rothschild in 1817 and became a Freiherr (baron) in 1822.

Amschel Mayer Rothschild was close to Orthodox Jewish circles, and was referred to by Eastern European Jews as "the pious Rothschild".

Honours 
 Commander of the Order of Leopold.

References

External links 

The Rothschild Archive

German bankers
Amschel Mayer
18th-century German Jews
1773 births
1855 deaths
Burials at the Old Jewish Cemetery, Frankfurt
19th-century German businesspeople